Charles U. "Chip" Martel (born 1953) is an American computer scientist and bridge player.

Martel was Inducted into the ACBL Hall of Fame in 2014.  He is married to Jan Martel, also in the ACBL Hall of Fame.

Academic life

Martel received a B.S. degree from Massachusetts Institute of Technology in 1975, and a Ph.D. from UC Berkeley in 1980. He helped establish the computer science department at UC Davis, received tenure there in 1985–86, and retired in 2013. At UC Davis he is Charles U. Martel, Professor Emeritus. His academic interests involved designing and analyzing algorithms.

Bridge accomplishments

Awards and honors
 Herman Trophy (1) 1981
 Mott-Smith Trophy (1) 1994
 Fishbein Trophy (1) 2000
 ACBL Hall of Fame, 2014

Wins

 Bermuda Bowl (4) 1985, 1987, 2001, 2017
 World Open Pairs Championship (1) 1982
 Rosenblum Cup (1) 1994 
 World Senior Teams (1) 2016 
 North American Bridge Championships (34)
 von Zedtwitz Life Master Pairs (1) 2007 
 Nail Life Master Open Pairs (1) 2012 
 North American Pairs (1) 1988 
 Grand National Teams (9) 1982, 1983, 1985, 1987, 1993, 1996, 2003, 2009, 2017 
 Jacoby Open Swiss Teams (1) 1994 
 Roth Open Swiss Teams (1) 2010 
 Vanderbilt (7) 1984, 1987, 1994, 1996, 1998, 2011, 2018 
 Mitchell Board-a-Match Teams (5) 1995, 2001, 2005, 2007, 2018 
 Chicago Mixed Board-a-Match (1) 2001 
 Reisinger (4) 1981, 1985, 1986, 1996 
 Spingold (3) 1990, 2000, 2016

Runners-up

 Bermuda Bowl (1) 1989
 Rosenblum Cup (1) 1982
 North American Bridge Championships
 Blue Ribbon Pairs (1) 1981 
 North American Pairs (1) 1981 
 Grand National Teams (5) 2000, 2001, 2006, 2014, 2016 
 Jacoby Open Swiss Teams (2) 2000, 2014 
 Roth Open Swiss Teams (1) 2013 
 Vanderbilt (3) 1992, 2006, 2010 
 Mitchell Board-a-Match Teams (1) 2008 
 Chicago Mixed Board-a-Match (1) 2004 
 Reisinger (3) 1983, 2006, 2007 
 Spingold (4) 1992, 1993, 1995, 2003

References

External links
 
 

1953 births
American contract bridge players
Bermuda Bowl players
University of California, Berkeley alumni
Massachusetts Institute of Technology alumni
University of California, Davis faculty
People from Davis, California
Living people
Place of birth missing (living people)
Date of birth missing (living people)